Orange Records is a British record label, founded in 1969. The founder was Cliff Cooper, owner of Orange Studios. Out of his studio, where prospective young artists produced demos, the record company was born.

History
Cooper negotiated a pressing and distribution deal with Pye Records for the UK. Soon afterwards, they signed licensing deals for territories around the world.

Cliff designed a record label using the "Voice of the World" logo and produced a stylish full-colour sleeve. Later, in the early 1970s, when Flower Power was running out of steam, he decided to change the label's logo, instead opting for a black background with gold lettering.

The first band to be signed and recorded under the label were Growth. A psychedelic influenced blues rock band well known in London. They recorded a self titled album which was not released. 
 
Cliff signed John Miles, who was with a band called The Influence. It was this group that provided Orange Records with its first release on 7 November 1969 titled "I Want To Live". The single didn't make the top ten, but it launched John's career.

At the same time, the label released a duo group called Contrast, featuring Roger and Christine Jeffrey. "Hey That's No Way To Say Goodbye" was their first single. Other releases from the early 1970s included "Ned Kelly" by Brian Chalker (1970) and "Candy Girl'" by The Pal Brothers (1973).

To promote the records Cooper engaged "Pluggers" to encourage airplay, and Cliff admits to being one of them. This gave him an insight in the record promotion and networking process, and he made a lot of good friends in the business. It was a tough business, though, and the promotion side was very expensive. Even now Cliff gets many requests to re-release those early records. Top DJ, Emperor Rosko still calls asking Cliff to bring out the entire Orange Records back catalogue.

Some productions
Some of the releases from later years include BIG BAND JOHN/Tribute to the Rat Pack and TOM & CATHERINE – A True Love Story (1999), both featuring recordings from John Miles of different eras.

Amplifier production
Besides the record company, Cooper is associated with production of amplifying equipment, through the company Orange Amps founded already in 1968.

References

External links

British record labels
Record labels established in 1969
1969 establishments in the United Kingdom